Daniel O'Malley is an Australian science fiction writer from Canberra.

Biography
O'Malley graduated with an undergraduate degree from Michigan State University and a master's degree in medieval history from Ohio State University. He worked for the Australian Transport Safety Bureau writing press releases and acting as a spokesman. His first novel, The Rook, was released in 2012 and was a winner of the 2012 Aurealis Award for Best Science Fiction Novel. The Rook has also been made into a television mini-series on the Starz network with Emma Greenwell in the role of Myfanwy Thomas.

Publications
 The Rook (2012)
 Stiletto (2016)
 Blitz (2022)

References

Australian public servants
Australian science fiction writers
Year of birth missing (living people)
Living people